Scott Webster (born 2 June 1976), is a field hockey player from Australia, who was a member of the team that won the silver medal at the 2002 Men's Hockey World Cup.

School
At school level Scott represented Christ Church Grammar School in the Public Schools Association Ray House Hockey Cup competition. He was selected to represent the PSA Combined XI (as Captain) against the HOTSPURS in 1993, in which the PSA Combined Team was victorious.

Club
At club level Scott plays for The University of Western Australia Hockey Club (UWAHC) as well as Suburban Nedlands Hockey Club.

National
Scott has represented Western Australia at underage and open level, having played for the SmokeFree WA Thundersticks 1995–2004. Including National titles in 1995, 1999, 2000 & 2002.

International
Scott has represented Australia (Kookaburras) at senior and Junior (Under 21) level. He has played a total of 80 matches and scored 20 goals.
 
Including:
2002 Hockey World Cup Silver Medal
2002 Champions Trophy 5th
2001 Champions Trophy 2nd
1999 Champions Trophy 1st
1998 Champions Trophy 3rd
2002 Commonwealth Games Gold Medal
1997 Junior Hockey World Cup Gold Medal

External links
 

1976 births
Living people
Australian male field hockey players
2002 Men's Hockey World Cup players
People educated at Christ Church Grammar School
Field hockey players from Perth, Western Australia
Commonwealth Games medallists in field hockey
Commonwealth Games gold medallists for Australia
Hampstead & Westminster Hockey Club players
Field hockey players at the 2002 Commonwealth Games
Medallists at the 2002 Commonwealth Games